General elections were held in Zimbabwe on 23 March 1990 to elect the President and Parliament. They were the first elections to be contested under the amended constitution of 1987, which established an elected executive presidency and abolished the Senate. They were also the first ever elections in the country to be contested on a single roll, with no separate voting for whites and blacks.

In the presidential contest, incumbent Robert Mugabe secured his first full term; he had become President following the 1987 constitutional amendments after serving as Prime Minister since the country gained internationally recognised independence in 1980. Mugabe's ZANU–PF party won 117 of the 120 elected seats in Parliament.

The elections were not free and fair. Mugabe's regime and the ZANU-PF used paramilitary organizations to intimidate opposition, as well as abused legislative and judicial powers to stay in power.

Results

President

Parliament
A total of 4,799,324 voters were registered, but 576,432 were in uncontested constituencies.

References

Elections in Zimbabwe
Zimbabwe
1990 in Zimbabwe
Presidential elections in Zimbabwe
March 1990 events in Africa